Jaskiranjit Singh Deol (born 12 March 1989) is a British actor, known for portraying the role of Kheerat Panesar on the BBC soap opera EastEnders from 2019 to 2022.

Career
Deol made his onscreen debut in the 2010 television film Casting Nina as Bhaljit Singh. He then made appearances in television series such as Code of a Killer, Together and The Halcyon. In October 2019, he began portraying the role of Kheerat Panesar in the BBC soap opera EastEnders. Deol's character was part of the first Sikh family in EastEnders. The Panesar family are of Ramgarhia Sikh heritage.

Filmography

Awards and nominations

References

External links
 

1989 births
21st-century English male actors
British male actors of Indian descent
English male actors of South Asian descent
English male film actors
English male soap opera actors
Living people
English male television actors
People from Hounslow
Male actors from London